The Love, Death & Mussolini E.P. was a cassette released by Steven Wilson under the pseudonym of Porcupine Tree, issued by No Man's Land in early 1990, and was limited to only 10 copies.

Background
Tracks 1 through 7 were later released on The Nostalgia Factory in 1991, as well as making it to the band's first studio album, On the Sunday of Life.... The song "Queen Quotes Crowley", however, was edited for release on the album, with the beginning minute of ambience removed. The song "Out" was later included on the vinyl edition of the compilation album Yellow Hedgerow Dreamscape and the 2013 CD remaster of the album. The song "It Will Rain for a Million Years" shares its name with a track in On the Sunday of Life... but is a totally different song (bearing some resemblance to "Always Never") and is elsewhere unavailable.

Nowadays, the album is nearly impossible to obtain. According to Steven Wilson himself, he doesn't have a copy of the album. Many of the lyrics on Love, Death & Mussolini were written by Alan Duffy and given to Wilson as a gift. The inlay of the sleeve contains credits to some musicians of which only JC Camillioni is an existing person, all of the rest are fictitious band members created by Wilson.

The album came with a booklet that had a mocking message explaining why the Love, Death & Mussolini EP is in fact an LP, descriptions of the songs and a catalogue.

Track listing
All tracks written by Steven Wilson except tracks A2, A3, A4, and B4 written by Wilson/Duffy.

Side one – "The Extended Player"
"Hymn" (Tree) – 1:22
"Footprints" (Tree, Duffy) – 5:56
"Linton Samuel Dawson" (Tree, Duffy) – 3:04
"And the Swallows Dance Above the Sun" (Tree, Duffy) – 4:12
"Queen Quotes Crowley" (St. Jemain) – 4:40

Side two – "The Long Player"
"No Luck With Rabbits" (Underspoon) – 0:47 
"Begonia Seduction Scene" (Jemain, Tree) – 2:34
"Out" (Tree, Underspoon) – 8:59
"It Will Rain for a Million Years" (Tree, Underspoon) – 4:05

Personnel (fiction)
PORCUPINE TREE – Vocal, Electric and Acoustic Guitars, Bass. (Steven Wilson)
SIR TARQUIN UNDERSPOON – Organ, Mellotron, Keyboards. (Steven Wilson)
EXPANDING FLAN – Drums, Percussion. (John Marshall)
SOLOMAIN ST. JEMAIN – Glissando Guitars and Vocals on "Queen Quotes Crowley". (Steven Wilson)
JC CAMILLIONI – Programming, Soundscapes. (Steven Wilson)

Recorded at No-Man's Land studios and Periscope Station.
Produced by JC Camillioni and Porcupine Tree for Hidden Art Productions.

References

1990 EPs
Porcupine Tree EPs